Acanthosoma labiduroides, also known as the scissors turtle bug in English, and  (Hasamitsuno-kamemushi) in Japanese, is a true bug species in the family Acanthosomatidae.

Description
The species' colour is green with yellow legs, orange antennae, and brown back.

References

Insects described in 1880
Insects of Japan
Acanthosomatidae